Naval Station Puget Sound is a former United States Naval station located on Sand Point in Seattle, Washington. Today, the land is occupied by Magnuson Park.

History
After World War I, a movement was begun to build Naval Air Station Seattle at Sand Point, and King County began acquiring surrounding parcels.  In 1922 the U.S. Navy began construction on the site, which it was leasing from the county, and in 1926 the Navy was deeded the  field outright. The name Carkeek Park was subsequently given to a new park on the west side of the city, north of Ballard on Puget Sound. This deed amounted to a public gift of $500,000 from the county to the Navy (equivalent to $ in  dollars) The Seattle Chamber of Commerce—a commercial entity—had done the same thing for the Army 28 years before with Fort Lawton, much of which is now Discovery Park.

Sand Point Airfield was the endpoint of the first aerial circumnavigation of the world in 1924. The historic flight helped convince Congress to develop Sand Point as a Naval Air Station.The former grass runways were paved in 1940–41, just prior to the U.S. entering World War II.  The primary runway was aligned 14/32 and was just under a mile in length at 5050 feet (1539 m).

During its years of operation, Naval Station Puget Sound was used as a facility to train naval aviators. Several trainer aircraft were forced to ditch in lake Washington over the years due to pilot error or aircraft malfunction. The wrecks of these aircraft still remain submerged near present-day Magnuson Park, where they are often visited by local divers:
1956 – PB4Y Privateer crashed shortly after takeoff when the pilot missed setting the flaps. The aircraft now sits under 155' of water near the boat ramp at Magnuson Park. 
1947 – PV-2 Harpoon crashed on approach to Sand Point Naval Air Station runway. The aircraft now sits under 140' of water off Sand Point.

Deactivation
NAS Seattle was deactivated in 1970 and the airfield was shut down; the reduced base was renamed "Naval Support Activity Seattle."  Negotiations began as to who would receive the surplus property.  In 1975 a large portion of the Navy's land was given to the City of Seattle and to the National Oceanic and Atmospheric Administration (NOAA).  The city's land was largely developed as a park and named Sand Point Park.  In 1977, it was renamed Magnuson Park in honor of longtime U.S. Senator Warren Magnuson, a former naval officer from Seattle. The airfield runways were demolished in the late 1970s and new construction on the north end for NOAA was completed in 1982 (photo – 1981). The installation was renamed "Naval Station Puget Sound" in 1986 and recommended for closure in April 1991, and the remaining land was divided among several entities, including the city.  The base was formally closed four years later in September 1995.

The former naval station was added to the National Register of Historic Places July 2, 2010 as Naval Air Station (NAS) Seattle and designated a Seattle landmark as the Sand Point Naval Air Station Historic District on March 16, 2011. Since then, many of the buildings have been redeveloped as affordable housing, sports facilities, artist studios, breweries and more.

References

External links 

 "The Fin Project"
 History Link.org – Sand Point Naval Air Station: 1920–1970
 Seattle Parks and Recreation – Magnuson Park – History: early airfield development
 Council Bill No: CB 118438, creating the Sand Point Naval Air Station Landmark District; numerous related documents attached.

Naval Stations of the United States Navy
National Register of Historic Places in Seattle
Military installations closed in 1995
Military facilities in Seattle
Defunct airports in Washington (state)